Theta Arietis, Latinised from θ Arietis, is the Bayer designation for a binary star system in the northern constellation of Aries. It is faintly visible to the naked eye with an apparent visual magnitude of 5.58. With an annual parallax shift of 7.61 mas, the distance to this star is an estimated  with a 10-light-year margin of error. It is drifting further away with a radial velocity of +6 km/s.

The primary, component A, is a white-hued, A-type main-sequence star with a stellar classification of A1 Vn. It is spinning at a rapid pace as shown by the projected rotational velocity of 186 km/s. This is causing the "nebulous" appearance of the absorption lines indicated by the 'n' suffix in the classification. In 2005, C. Neiner and associates classified this as a Be star because is displays emission features in the hydrogen Balmer lines.

In 2016, a solar-mass companion was reported in close orbit around this star, based on observations using adaptive optics with the Gemini North Telescope.

References

External links
Aladin previewer
Aladin sky atlas
 HR 669
 Image Theta Arietis

A-type main-sequence stars
Be stars
Binary stars

Aries (constellation)
Arietis, Theta
BD+19 0340
Arietis, 22
014191
010732
0669